The 1988 Australian Touring Car Championship (promoted as the Shell Ultra Australian Touring Car Championship thanks to sponsorship from Shell Australia) was a CAMS sanctioned motor racing title for drivers of Group 3A Touring Cars. It was the 29th running of the Australian Touring Car Championship. The championship began on 6 March at Calder Park Raceway and ended on 17 July at Oran Park Raceway after nine rounds.

The championship was won by Dick Johnson driving a Ford Sierra RS500.

The 1988 Australian Manufacturers' Championship was contested over the same nine round series. Points were awarded only for class placings and each manufacturer could count only its best eight round results. The title was shared by Ford, which won the 3001 to 6000cc class in all nine rounds, BMW, which won the 2001 to 3000cc class in eight rounds, and Toyota, which won the Up to 2000cc class in every round.

Season summary
The championship was dominated by those driving the Ford Sierra RS500, specifically the Shell Ultra-Hi Racing Sierras of Dick Johnson and John Bowe. Between them the pair won eight of the nine rounds with team owner Johnson winning his 4th touring car championship. Tony Longhurst was the only other driver to win a round in his Freeport Racing Sierra. Longhurst won Round 6 at Lakeside from Johnson after Dick was penalised 1 minute for jumping the start.

With Sierras winning each round of the championship, 1988 was the first time since the Holden Torana A9Xs of 1979 that a single model car had won each round of the championship. Up to and including the 2016 V8 Supercar Championship Series, such single model domination has not been seen since in Australian touring car racing.

Defending champion Jim Richards, new to the Mobil team in 1988 (though he had previously driven for the team as Brock's winning co driver at Bathurst from 1978 to 1981 when it was known as the Holden Dealer Team), had a best finish of 3rd at Winton, while Brock could finish no higher than 4th in the dry-wet-dry round at Wanneroo Park despite being one of the few drivers to remain on slicks after the rain caused mayhem and mid-race restart. Unfortunately for the Mobil team, the advantage the M3s had in both handling and brakes was not enough to combat the outright power of the Sierras.

After two seasons with the old Skyline DR30 RS, Nissan debuted their new turbocharged, Straight-6, Skyline HR31 GTS-R for 1987 drivers Glenn Seton and George Fury and were expected to challenge the Sierras. However, the team's testing and development of the GTS-R was in the races due to the late arrival of parts from Japan and the  cars did not have the speed or reliability of the Fords with a best finish of 3rd for Fury at Amaroo Park. Unfortunately for Fred Gibson's team, the Australian racing program had fallen behind both the Japanese domestic scene as well as the European Touring Car Championship (ETCC) campaign run by Howard Marsden in importance to Nismo in 1988 and as such the Gibson Team had a late arrival for their cars and did not appear until Round 5 in Adelaide with a single car for Fury (to keep his eye in, Seton actually drove a Nissan powered Ralt RT4 in a one-off appearance and won the Adelaide round of the Australian Drivers' Championship that weekend). After Adelaide, Fury and Seton then alternated drives in the team's car until a second Skyline appeared at the penultimate round at Amaroo. Fury then stepped aside at the final round at Oran Park to allow 1987 Australian 2.0 Litre Champion Mark Skaife to drive in his ATCC debut. Seton, who had finished second in the 1987 ATCC, would finish the series in 15th place while Fury fared marginally better finishing 13th.

Delays in the building of the new fuel injected Holden VL Commodore SS Group A SV also saw to it that the factory Holden challenge, headed by Larry Perkins and his team in the 1987 model 'HDT' VL with backing from Holden Special Vehicles, was almost non-existent. Perkins best finish was 3rd at Sandown in Round 7, greatly helped by the number of retirements from the front running Sierras and the still bug riddled Nissan driven that weekend by Fury. Although supported by numerous privateer Commodores (most of whom were driving customer cars built by Perkins Engineering), Perkins played virtually a lone hand for Holden as regular Commodore racer Allan Grice (Roadways) was racing a GTS-R for Nissan in the ETCC and Brock was now racing for BMW. Perkins' own retirement in 3 of the 8 rounds also killed any chance of a Holden driver taking the series from the all-conquering Fords.

1988 saw the last ever ATCC race held at the 2.41 km (1.50 mi) Adelaide International Raceway (AIR), which had held at least one round of the series every year since the circuit opened in 1972, with victory predictably going to the Ford Sierra RS500 of Dick Johnson (with John Bowe finishing 2nd it was the Shell Team's third 1–2 in just 5 rounds). From 1989, the South Australian round of the series would be held at the track AIR replaced on the ATCC calendar in 1972, Mallala Motor Sport Park.

The year also saw four-time champion Allan Moffat return to the series for the first time since 1984. Moffat had managed to convince Ruedi Eggenberger to build him a customer Sierra RS500 to run in Australia. With sponsorship from ANZ Bank, Allan Moffat Racing joined the series from Round 4 at Wanneroo Park. Running a conservative program while his team learned about the Sierra, Moffat did not have the pace of the Johnson cars, or the Sierras of Tony Longhurst, Andrew Miedecke and Colin Bond (who was racing in the outright category of the ATCC for the first time since 1978). Moffat's best finish was third in Round 6 at Lakeside. Despite the disqualification of the Eggenberger Sierras at the 1987 James Hardie 1000, Moffat had no problems with scrutineering, unlike 1986 ATCC champion Robbie Francevic whose Sierra, built in West Germany by Walter Wolf Racing, raced under protest in Round 3 at Winton before the car was ruled illegal before the start of practice for Round 5 at Adelaide. Although Francevic contended his car was legal, they were his only appearances in the championship.

Teams and drivers

The following drivers and teams competed in the 1988 Australian Touring Car Championship.

Race calendar
The 1988 Australian Touring Car Championship was contested over a nine-round series with each round being a single race of just under one hour in duration. This would be the 15th and last time the Adelaide International Raceway hosted an ATCC race having first hosted a round in 1972.

Points system
Points were awarded on a 20–15–12–10–8–6–4–3–2–1 basis for the top ten race positions at each round. Only the best eight results could be retained by each driver.

Championship standings

See also
 1988 Australian Touring Car season
 1988 Australian Manufacturers' Championship

References

External links
 Official V8 Supercar site Contains historical ATCC information.
 1988 Australian Touring Car race images at www.autopics.com.au

Australian Touring Car Championship seasons
Touring Car Championship